Below are the national team rosters for three of the six teams that competed at the 1987 Canada Cup ice hockey tournament. For Czechoslovakia, Finland and Sweden, see 1987 Canada Cup#Rosters.

Canada

Coaches

Players

United States

Coaches

Players

USSR

Coaches

Players

Canada Cup rosters
1987 in ice hockey